Nothing But Blue Skies is a humorous fantasy novel by English author Tom Holt.  It was first published in the UK by Orbit Books in 2001.

Synopsis

Karen is a Chinese dragon with weather powers, who falls in love with a human and disguises herself as a human so that they can be together; when her father, the adjutant-general to the Dragon King of the North West, comes looking for her, things become much more complicated.

Reception
In the Guardian, Jon Courtenay Grimwood declared that if readers "(e)xpect no logic from this book, (then) everything will be fine."

References

2001 British novels
British fantasy novels
British comedy novels
Novels by Tom Holt
Orbit Books books